The men's 200 metre freestyle event was the 10th event contested on the 2007 World Aquatics Championship for Swimming.

The 15 heats began at 10:27, on 26 March 2007, at the Rod Laver Arena, in Melbourne Park.

The semifinals started on the evening of the same day at 20:17.

The final started at 19:00 on the following day, 27 March.

Records

Heats

Semifinals

Final

References

Swimming at the 2007 World Aquatics Championships